Swalwell is a village in Gateshead, Tyne and Wear, England, in the United Kingdom.

History

On 27 August 1640, an encampment of soldiers was gathered in the fields north of Whickham church on the slope down to Swalwell. This was part of the Royalist army of King Charles I preparing to fight the Scots. Information was soon received that the Scots led by General Leslie were crossing the river at Newburn to attack the English at Stella, after which the Whickham contingent would be threatened, and so orders were given to burn the camp at Whickham rather than let it fall into enemy hands. Many of the villagers of Whickham joined in the retreat which followed. The fire at the camp ignited a seam of coal which apparently burned for several years in various places including the Coaly Well. On 7 September 1648 a burial took place at Whickham churchyard of a soldier in Cromwell's army which was then camped north of the church. Cromwell is supposed to have stayed in Whickham for two days before marching to Scotland down Clockburn Lane on 25 July 1650 on his way to the battle of Dunbar, crossing the Tyne at Newburn and using the ancient route of the cattle drovers.

In 1870–72 Swalwell had a population of 1,479. There were 190 houses, chapels of United Presbyterians, Wesleyans and Primitive Methodists, and extensive ironworks.

Sights (points of interest) 
Holy Trinity Church
Swalwell Bridge

Notable people
The following notable people were either born in Swalwell or lived there for a significant period:
Jimmy Armstrong – professional footballer
Harry Clasper – professional rower
Margaret Dryburgh – a school teacher and missionary who was interned by the Japanese in World War II
Charlton Nesbit – wood-engraver
William Shield – Master of the King's Music

References

External links

 Swalwell Online
 Swalwell

Populated places in Tyne and Wear
Gateshead